Reginald DeMerritt Wentworth (August 31, 1868 – after 1918) was an American football coach. He was the first head football coach at the University of Texas at Austin serving one season, in 1894, and compiling a record of 6–1.   Following the 1894 season, Wentworth returned to the East Coast and subsequently went into marine insurance in New York City, where he was also an athletic coach at Trinity School.  In 1918, Wentworth was appointed as athletic director at the Marine Aeronautic Training Camp in Miami, Florida.  Wentworth graduated from Williams College in 1891.

Head coaching record

References

1868 births
Year of death missing
19th-century players of American football
Texas Longhorns football coaches
Williams Ephs football players